Patriot Front is an American white nationalist and neo-fascist hate group. Part of the broader alt-right movement, the group split off from the neo-Nazi organization Vanguard America in the aftermath of the Unite the Right rally in 2017. Patriot Front's aesthetic combines traditional Americana with fascist symbolism. The group reportedly had between 200 and 300 members as of late 2021. According to the Anti-Defamation League, the group generated 82% of reported incidents in 2021 involving distribution of racist, antisemitic, and other hateful propaganda in the United States, comprising 3,992 incidents in every state except Hawaii and Alaska.

History and beliefs

Patriot Front is led by Thomas Ryan Rousseau, who was a teenager when he founded the group. In 2017, Rousseau took control of Vanguard America's web and Discord server several weeks before the Unite the Right rally in Charlottesville, Virginia, in which he participated as the leader of Vanguard America's contingent. Following the bad press arising from the rally, Rousseau left Vanguard. He used the group's domain name to form Patriot Front as a new group and recruit rally participants, though most of Patriot Front's members were former Vanguard members. Rousseau has been arrested repeatedly in the group's activities.

As with Vanguard America, Patriot Front supports a version of white-centered ideology compatible with the views of fascists across America, such as closed borders and authoritarian government. According to the Anti-Defamation League (ADL), "Patriot Front is a white supremacist group whose members maintain that their ancestors conquered America and bequeathed it to them, and no one else."

The group uses patriotic imagery to broaden its appeal while adding symbols like the fasces, the symbol of fascism. It uses attention-grabbing techniques like detonating smoke bombs during demonstrations and protests. According to the Southern Poverty Law Center (SPLC), "Patriot Front focuses on theatrical rhetoric and activism that can be easily distributed as propaganda for its chapters across the country."

The group published a manifesto which contained passages including:

Those of foreign birth may occupy civil status within the lands occupied by the state, and they may even be dutiful citizens, yet they may not be American. Membership within the American nation is inherited through blood, not ink. Even those born in America may yet be foreign...Nationhood cannot be bestowed upon those who are not of the founding stock of our people, and those who do not share the common spirit that permeates our greater civilization, and the European diaspora...In order to survive as a culture, a heritage, and a way of being, our nation must learn that its collective interests are fighting against its collective threats of replacement and enslavement...The damage done to this nation and its people will not be fixed if every issue requires the approval and blessing from the dysfunctional American democratic system. Democracy has failed in this once great nation.

The group's members consist of eight regional networks, and its recruitment is primarily done online. The group avoids talking about guns or violence online as a policy, but as Pete Simi, an expert on white supremacy, explained to Pro Publica, "It is very common for the leadership of these groups to disqualify violence, while doing things that are encouraging violence. ... It is part of their strategy to avoid liability, while simultaneously promoting hate. When they say they are not violent, this is a lie. They are promoting violence by their goals."

A 2019 investigation by ProPublica estimated the group had about 300 members; in leaked chats at the end of 2021, Rousseau complained about a "220's to 230's membership rut". According to the SPLC, as of 2021, Patriot Front had 42 chapters with an average of 11 members per chapter and was arguably the leading white supremacist group in the country, and the most active in using flyers for recruitment. According to ProPublica, Rousseau and others in the group "delight in seeing their actions reflected in the SPLC’s nationwide map recording acts of hate and in the media".

Activities and events

Patriot Front's demonstrations, literature, and sometimes acts of service are "tightly choreographed and scripted to maximize propaganda value", according to the SPLC. The ADL estimated that Patriot Front generated 82% of reported incidents of distributing racist, antisemitic and other hateful propaganda in the U.S. during 2021, and 80% in 2020. According to leaked chats made public in January 2022, Patriot Front members are required to deface racial justice murals in their areas.

2018 
On July 28, Members of Patriot Front marched on an Occupy ICE protest in San Antonio, Texas, and filmed themselves vandalizing protestors' tents and signs.

2019 
On February 13, hundreds of racist and anti-immigrant signs and flyers were taped up in the East Boston section of Boston, Massachusetts, an area with many immigrants. Patriot Front claimed responsibility. Boston Mayor Marty Walsh denounced the incident. On February 15, Boston police arrested three Patriot Front members; two faced charges of carrying weapons, and one was charged with assault on a police officer after allegedly slapping an officer's hand.

2020 
On February 8, about 100 Patriot Front marched in Washington, D.C., along the National Mall from the Lincoln Memorial to the US Capitol grounds, and then headed north to a Walmart near Washington Union Station. The marchers wore khakis, matching dark blue jackets, hats, full white face masks, and dark sunglasses, and carried various modified versions of the American flag with the Patriot Front logo.

In August, during protests and counter-protests in Weatherford, Texas, over a Confederate statue, police arrested three men including Rousseau who had plastered stickers on signs, parks and property. They were charged with criminal mischief, jailed on a $500 bond and released.

2021 
On January 29, a group of men wearing khaki pants, matching blue jackets with patches, and white face masks marched on the National Mall toward the US Capitol carrying flags with Patriot Front symbolism.

On December 4, More than 100 members of Patriot Front held a rally in downtown Washington, D.C., chanting "reclaim America", carrying flags and plastic shields and wearing uniforms consisting of white gaiters, sunglasses, blue jackets, khaki pants, brown boots and hats. Some wore plastic shin guards.

2022 
In January, members of Patriot Front were seen at the 2022 March for Life anti-abortion rally in Washington, D.C.

On June 11, police arrested 31 members of Patriot Front they stopped inside a U-Haul truck near an LGBT Pride event in Coeur d'Alene, Idaho. They were charged with conspiracy to riot. Rousseau was one of the members arrested. An anonymous caller tipped off police when they saw the group of men climbing into a U-Haul after retrieving shields from the back of a truck. The Kootenai County Sheriff's Office released the mugshots and names of all 31 arrested, who were from at least 11 states. After the arrests, the Coeur d'Alene police chief said the police department received death and doxxing threats. By June 13, all 31 members were released on bail. Court documents stated police had recovered a typed document that detailed the group's goal and planning for the day.

On July 2, about 100 masked members with shields and a banner marched through Boston, with stops at the Boston Public Library and Old State House building. Police said one man was injured in a confrontation with Patriot Front members.

Leaked online chats
On January 21, 2022, Unicorn Riot, a left-wing nonprofit media organization, published more than 400 gigabytes of leaked audio files, chat logs, documents, photographs and videos from Patriot Front's chat server. The leak revealed the group's efforts to recruit new members and increase its public profile through private communications on Rocket.Chat, an open-source messaging platform.

The chat logs showed the group struggled to expand membership, often reprimanding members for not meeting fitness and participation requirements, according to The Guardian. In a conversation with Patriot Front “lieutenants” on December 14, 2021, Rousseau wrote, "We are absolutely desperate for new people. We've been in the 220's to 230's membership rut for nearly a full year."

The communications revealed the group attempted to inflate its membership numbers and importance; outlined plans to spread misinformation about public events on social media sites, such as Twitter, Reddit and 4chan, and send deceptive news tips to journalists at traditional media outlets; and detailed notes of interviews with potential members. The leak also included media of members training, vandalizing, and demonstrating; Rousseau at a 2021 American Renaissance conference; and Patriot Front's guides to behavior.

See also

 Far-right politics
 List of neo-Nazi organizations 
 List of organizations designated by the Southern Poverty Law Center as hate groups
 List of white nationalist organizations

References

Further reading

External links

2017 establishments in the United States
Alt-right organizations
Anti-Chinese sentiment in the United States
Neo-Nazi organizations in the United States
Patriot movement
Political organizations established in 2017